Makoto Sawaguchi (澤口誠, born December 5, 1991) is a  former Japanese  professional basketball player who last played for the Iwate Big Bulls of the B.League in Japan. He was selected by the Akita Northern Happinets with the 9th overall pick in the 2010 bj League draft.

Career statistics 

|-
| align="left" |  2010-11
| align="left" | Akita
| 48 || 2 || 12.4 || .317 || .288 || .649 || 1.3 || 1.1 || 0.3 || 0 || 5.3
|-
| align="left" | 2011-12
| align="left" | Iwate
| 49 || 27 || 26.7 || .327 || .277 || .765 || 2.6 || 1.5 || 0.7 || 0.1 ||  9.7
|-
| align="left" | 2012-13
| align="left" | Iwate
| 50 || 6 || 11.2 || .343 || .277 || .870 || 1.1 || 0.6 || 0.3 || 0.0 ||  5.1 
|-
| align="left" | 2013-14
| align="left" | Aomori
| 52 ||47  || 22.5 || .350 || .274 || .656 || 2.5 || 2.4 || 0.5 || 0 || 7.6
|-
| align="left" | 2014-15
| align="left" | Aomori
| 51 || 26 || 14.5 || .347 || .281 || .667 || 1.7 || 1.5 || 0.3 || 0 || 4.2
|-
| align="left" | 2015-16
| align="left" | Aomori
| 47 || 33 || 19.6 || .434 || .368 || .748 || 1.9 || 2.4 || 0.7 || 0 || 7.9
|-
| align="left" | 2016-17
| align="left" | Iwate
| 58 || 48 || 25.3 || .342 || .211 || .777 || 2.8 || 2.9 || 0.4 || 0.2 || 9.4
|-
| align="left" | 2019-20
| align="left" | Iwate
| 12 ||  || 12.7 || .310 || .000 || .706 || 1.6 || 1.6 || 0.6 || 0.1 || 3.2
|-

Gallery

References

1991 births
Living people
Akita Northern Happinets players
Aomori Wat's players
Iwate Big Bulls coaches
Iwate Big Bulls players
Japanese men's basketball players

Sportspeople from Iwate Prefecture
Guards (basketball)